The 1964 Texas gubernatorial election was held on November 3, 1964, to elect the governor of Texas. Incumbent Democratic Governor John Connally was reelected to a second term, winning 74% of the vote to Republican Jack Crichton's 26%.

Connally swept all 254 counties in his massive landslide reelection victory and was sworn in for his second term on January 26, 1965.

Primaries

Republican

Democratic

Results

References

1964
Texas
November 1964 events in the United States
1964 Texas elections